Ričardas Vaitkevičius (6 May 1933 – 3 January 1996) was a Lithuanian rower who specialized in the eights. In this event he won three silver medal at the European and world championships of 1962–1964 and finished fifth at the 1964 Summer Olympics. While competing Vaitkevičius also acted as a Soviet rowing coach at the 1964 and 1968 Olympics, and he continued coaching and referring rowing competitions until 1993. His elder brother Eugenijus (1931–2011) and wife Irena Bačiulytė were also a competitive rowers and rowing coaches.

References

1933 births
1996 deaths
Lithuanian male rowers
Olympic rowers of the Soviet Union
Rowers at the 1964 Summer Olympics
World Rowing Championships medalists for the Soviet Union
European Rowing Championships medalists